E.M.G. Yadava Women's College is in Thiruppalai, Madurai, India. It is affiliated to Madurai Kamaraj University and run by the Yadava Community Educational Trust. The motto of the college is "Magalir Arivu, Kudumba Uyarvu" which means "By educating a woman we educate the whole family." It was established with the aim of providing education to the underprivileged women students. The mission of the institution is to achieve gender parity through women education and thereby creating a society in which the women become respectable, self-reliant and self-sufficient.

History
The college was started only with pre-university courses at E.M.G. Kalyana Mandabam at Tallakulam, Madurai in 1974. Then the college was shifted to the present campus at New Natham Road, Thiruppalai on 15 acres of land donated by E.M.G. Charitable Trust in 1980. It was upgraded as First Grade College in 1979 offering undergraduate courses.

Courses offered

Aided courses
B.A., History (E.M & T.M)
B.A., English Literature
B.Sc., Zoology
B.Com
B.Sc., Mathematics

Unaided courses, U.G.
B.B.A.
B.Sc., Computer Science
B.Sc., Information Technology
B.A., Tamil Literature
B.Com (General)
B.Sc., Mathematics
B.Sc., Physics with IT
B.Sc., Nutrition & Dietetics with IT
B.Com (Computer Applications)
BCA
B.Sc., Chemistry

Unaided courses, P.G.
M.Sc., Mathematics with CA
M.Sc., Information Technology
MCA

Certificate courses
Certificate in Gandhian Thought
Add-On Certificate Course in Spoken English
Computerized Accounting - Tally

Diploma courses
Diploma in Gandhian Thought
Computer Applications
Diploma in Biotechnology
Information Technology
Diploma in Food & Nutrition
Computerized Accounting - Tally
Advanced Diploma in Tally
Research Programme
Mphil (Mathematics)

Infrastructure
The college has a women's hostel named after politician former Defence Minister of India Mulayam Singh Yadav of the Samajwadi Party because the hostel was constructed using a donation from him.

See also
 Yadava College

References

External links
 College Official Website

Women's universities and colleges in Tamil Nadu
Colleges in Madurai
Universities and colleges in Madurai
Educational institutions established in 1974
1974 establishments in Tamil Nadu
Colleges affiliated to Madurai Kamaraj University